Fidel Escobar Mendieta (born 9 January 1995) is a Panamanian professional footballer who plays as a centre-back for Costa Rica club Deportivo Saprissa, and the Panama national team.

Club career

San Francisco
Born in Panama City, Escobar graduated from San Francisco's youth setup, and made his senior debut during the 2012–13 campaign, aged only 18. During the next season he established himself as a first team regular making 14 starts and scoring one goal. On 26 October 2013, Escobar scored his first goal for Los Monjes in a 2–0 victory over Chorrillo.

Sporting San Miguelito
After impressing with San Francisco, Escobar was signed by Sporting San Miguelito for the 2014 Clausura season. He made 14 appearances scoring one goal in his first season at the club. On 16 March 2014, Escobar scored his first goal with San Miguelito in a 2–2 draw with Alianza. In his two and a half seasons with the club Escobar made 65 league appearances scoring six goals.

Sporting B (loan)
As a result of his impressive play with his club and at the Under-20 World Cup Escobar received the attention of European clubs. During July 2016, Escobar was sent on loan with an option to buy to Sporting Clube de Portugal's reserve side Sporting B. Escobar made his debut for Sporting B on 6 August 2016 playing the entire match in a 1–2 loss to Portimonense S.C. In January 2017, Escobar attempted to terminate his contract with Sporting in search of other opportunities and was threatened with legal action by the Portuguese side. Escobar eventually apologized to the club and was reinstated for the second half of the season. He made his return to the side on 15 April 2017, starting in a 2–0 victory over União da Madeira.

New York Red Bulls (loan)
On 27 July 2017 it was announced that Escobar was joining New York Red Bulls on an 18-month loan. For his play on 10 March 2018, in which he helped lead New York to a 4–0 victory over Portland Timbers in the team's first league match of the season, Escobar was named to the Starting XI for Major League Soccer's Team of the Week.

Escobar was loaned to affiliate side New York Red Bulls II of the United Soccer League for the match against Tampa Bay Rowdies on 14 April 2018. He opened the scoring for New York in the 5–0 victory.

Escobar's loan was not extended by the Red Bulls at the end of their 2018 season.

Córdoba (loan)
On 10 July 2019, after a six-month spell at Correcaminos UAT, Escobar joined Spanish Segunda División B side Córdoba CF on loan for one year.

Alcorcón
On 28 July 2020, Escobar agreed to a three-year contract with AD Alcorcón in Segunda División. On 31 January 2022, he was loaned to Primera División RFEF side Cultural y Deportiva Leonesa.

International career
Escobar played at the 2015 FIFA U-20 World Cup in New Zealand. He made his debut in the competition on 30 May 2015 scoring an 84th-minute equalizer in a 2–2 draw against heavily favored side Argentina.

Escobar made his senior debut for Panama in a February 2015 friendly match against the United States.

In May 2018 he was named in Panama’s preliminary 35 man squad for the 2018 FIFA World Cup in Russia, and played all three matches in an eventual group-stage exit.

Career statistics

Club

International

International goals
Scores and results list Panama's goal tally first.

Honours

Club
New York Red Bulls
MLS Supporters' Shield (1): 2018

International
Panama U20
Runners-up
 CONCACAF U-20 Championship: 2015

References

External links

1995 births
Living people
Sportspeople from Panama City
Panamanian footballers
Association football defenders
Liga Panameña de Fútbol players
San Francisco F.C. players
Sporting San Miguelito players
Liga Portugal 2 players
Sporting CP B players
Major League Soccer players
USL Championship players
New York Red Bulls players
New York Red Bulls II players
Correcaminos UAT footballers
Segunda División players
Segunda División B players
Córdoba CF players
AD Alcorcón footballers
Cultural Leonesa footballers
2015 CONCACAF U-20 Championship players
Footballers at the 2015 Pan American Games
Copa América Centenario players
2017 CONCACAF Gold Cup players
2018 FIFA World Cup players
2019 CONCACAF Gold Cup players
Panama international footballers
Panamanian expatriate footballers
Panamanian expatriate sportspeople in the United States
Panamanian expatriate sportspeople in Mexico
Panamanian expatriate sportspeople in Spain
Expatriate footballers in Portugal
Expatriate soccer players in the United States
Expatriate footballers in Mexico
Expatriate footballers in Spain
Pan American Games competitors for Panama